Walker Basin is a valley in the Southern Sierra Nevada, in Kern County, California. It is named for Joseph R. Walker, a pioneer in the area.

Geography
Walker Basin is located south of Lake Isabella and the Kern River Valley, east of Bakersfield, and north of Tehachapi Pass, near the southern boundary of the Sequoia National Forest.

References

Valleys of Kern County, California